Mansa district is a district in the state of Punjab, India. The district headquarters is Mansa city. Mansa district was formed on 13 April 1992 from the erst while district of Bathinda. The district has three tehsils: Mansa, Budhlada and Sardulgarh; and five development blocks: Mansa, Budhlada, Sardulgarh, Bhikhi and Jhunir.

Geography

The district is roughly triangular in shape and is bounded on the northwest by Bathinda district, on the northeast by Sangrur district, and on the south by Haryana state. It is situated on the Bathinda-Jind-Delhi railway and the Barnala-Sardulgarh-Sirsa road. The district is divided into three tehsils, Budhlada, Mansa, and Sardulgarh. The Ghaggar River flows through the Sardulgarh Tehsil in the southwestern corner of the district.

History

Mansa District was formerly a part of the Phulkia Sikh Dynasty (1722–1948) then part of Kaithal Sikh Kingdom (1762–1857).
The present district was formed on 13 April 1992 from the erstwhile Bathinda district. The town is said to have been founded by Bhai Gurdas who hailed from Dhingar, Mansa district. He is said to have been married at this place among the Dhaliwal Jat Sikh. Once he came to his in-laws to take his wife along with him but they refused to send her. At this, Bhai Gurdas sat in meditation before the house of his in-laws. After some time, the parents of the girl agreed to send their daughter with Bhai Gurdas. But he refused to take her along with him, stating that he had now renounced the worldly way of life. In his memory, his Smadh was constructed where a fair is held every year in March–April. People in large numbers attend the fair and offer Laddus and Gur (jaggery) at Smadh. Class ‘A’ municipality has been functioning in the town since 1952. The town has two Colleges, viz. Govt. Nehru Memorial Post Graduate College and S.D. Kanya Mahavidyalaya College, 3 Senior Secondary Schools, 90 High Schools, 1 Middle School, 1 Primary School, and one District Library and has one civil hospital, 3 Dispensaries, 1 Ayurvedic, and 4 Homeopathic dispensaries. There are two police stations i.e. PS City and PS Sadar and also a railway station.

Ancient period 
The ancient history of the Mansa district has been traced to the Indus Valley civilization. The archaeological finds at different villages of Mansa district are almost similar to those of Harappa and Mohenjo-Daro. It is divided into three parts Pre-Harappa, Harappa and Late Harappa.

Demographics

According to the 2011 census Mansa district has a population of 2,423,655. This gives it a ranking of 489th in India (out of a total of 640). Its population growth rate over the decade 2001-2011 was 11.62%. Mansa has a sex ratio of 880 females for every 1000 males and a literacy rate of 86.8%.

At the time of the 2011 census, 98.53% of the population spoke Punjabi and 1.31% Hindi as their first language.

Agriculture and industry

Mansa is situated in the cotton belt of Punjab and therefore popularly called the "Area of white gold". Indeed, agriculture forms the backbone of the district economy.

Mansa is home to the largest Thermal Power Plant of Punjab. The Thermal Power Plant has the capacity to produce 1980MW of electricity

Industrially, the district is very deficient, yet some trade and industry is being carried out in urban areas.

Major cities and towns

Village Ubha
Ubha is situated in Mansa District. It is famous for its temple.

Bareta
Bareta is situated on Bathinda–Delhi railway line.

Budhlada or Badlada

Badlasa was named after the Budha Singh Badholada, who was a  khatri sikh by caste. It is also situated on
Bathinda-Delhi railway line. It was the largest market of Eastern Punjab and a very big recruitment centre for military personnel.

Politics

Notable people
Ajmer Singh Aulakh, Indian author, Sahitya Akademi Award winner for Best Drama Director, hails from the village of Kishagarh Farwaahi
Aman Dhaliwal, Indian model and actor
Deep Dhillon, Indian actor
Gavie Chahal, Indian actor, hails from the village of Sher Khan Wala
Harmanjeet Singh,  Indian poet and lyricist
Kulwinder Billa, Indian singer, hails from the village of Dhaipi
Nisha Bano, Indian actress and singer
Nirmal Rishi, Indian actress of film and television
Sawarn Singh, Indian Olympic rower
Sidhu Moose Wala, Indian singer and politician; from the village of Moosa, his namesake
Shipra Goyal, Indian singer
Sukhmeet Singh, Indian rower

References

External links 

 Official website

 
Districts of Punjab, India
1992 establishments in Punjab, India